North Air Force Auxiliary Airfield  is a military airfield located  east of North, a town in Orangeburg County, South Carolina, United States.

It is owned by the U.S. Air Force and is used primarily for C-17 Globemaster III training by the 437th Airlift Wing (437 AW) and its Air Force Reserve "Associate" unit, the 315th Airlift Wing (315 AW), at Joint Base Charleston. Other units can utilize North with prior coordination with the 628th Air Base Wing (628 ABW). The 628th Civil Engineering Squadron (628 CES) of the 628 ABWW at Charleston AFB maintains a detachment to maintain and operate the airfield.

Facilities 
It contains two asphalt paved runways: the main runway (6/24) measuring 10,000 x 150 ft (3,048 x 46 m) and an asphalt runway (5/23) measuring 3,500 x 90 ft (1,067 x 27 m).

History

The land for North Army Airfield was bought between 1942 and 1945. The airfield was built by the United States Army Air Forces The original dirt runway was constructed in April 1943 and used by Hughes Aircraft Company for testing, as well as being a satellite airfield of Columbia Army Air Base, supporting B-25 Mitchell medium bomber training for Third Air Force's III Air Support Command. Training was accomplished by 74th Station Complement Squadron which also maintained the facility.

After World War II, a 10,000 ft runway and a 3,000 ft assault runway were built. North Airfield (later North Auxiliary Airfield, Northfield Air Base), has been under the jurisdiction of Fort Jackson, the former 363rd Tactical Reconnaissance Wing at Shaw AFB, and the United States Department of Energy (DOE). On 1 October 1979, the 437th Airlift Wing at Charleston AFB assumed real property jurisdiction, control, and accountability over North Field.

With the transition of the 437th Airlift Wing and 512th Airlift Wing (Associate) to the C-17 Globemaster III, an air traffic control tower and permanent aircraft rescue and firefighting (ARFF) station was constructed at North Auxiliary Airfield, establishing it as a controlled versus uncontrolled airport.

See also

List of United States Air Force installations
South Carolina World War II Army Airfields

References

External links
 North Auxiliary Airfield from Joint Base Charleston website
 
 

Installations of the United States Air Force in South Carolina
1942 establishments in South Carolina
Airports established in 1942
Airports in South Carolina
Orangeburg County, South Carolina
Airfields of the United States Army Air Forces in South Carolina
Buildings and structures in Orangeburg County, South Carolina